The Long Lost is a collaboration between American musicians Daedelus and Laura Darlington. The pair are also husband and wife. They dated in high school after initially meeting as members of their high school orchestra, as well as partners in the ballroom dance club. After a few years apart, they re-met and gradually formed this project. In 2009, the duo released the first studio album, The Long Lost, on Ninja Tune. Daedelus has stated that they are currently working on new material.

Discography

Albums
The Long Lost (2009)

Singles
"Woebegone" (2008)
"Amiss" (2009)

References

External links
 on Ninja Tune

Ninja Tune artists
Musical groups established in 1998
Musical groups from California
American musical duos